Mike Duffey (born December 14, 1977) is an American politician who was appointed as Senior Vice Chancellor of the Ohio Department of Higher Education in January 2019. Duffey served as a member of the Ohio House of Representatives from 2011 to 2019.

Career

Duffey graduated with honors from Thomas Worthington High School in 1996. Four years later, he earned his bachelor's degree in political science from the University of Michigan. While in college, Duffey interned in the Washington, D.C. office of Congressman John Kasich, later Governor of Ohio. He also worked for Ohio Secretary of State J. Kenneth Blackwell.

From 2003 to 2010, Duffey was employed with Hinson Ltd Public Relations and in 2008 was promoted to Director of Media Relations. Prior to that, from 2001 to 2003, he worked as a reporter for Hannah News Service, covering the Ohio legislature as a member of the Ohio Legislative Correspondents Association (OLCA). He is a former twice-elected member of Worthington City Council.

Ohio House of Representatives
When incumbent Representative Kevin Bacon decided to run for the state Senate seat being vacated by David Goodman, Duffey entered the race to replace him.  After being uncontested in the Republican primary, Duffey went on to face Democrat David Robinson in the general election. With Bacon out of the race, Democrats saw the 21st District as one of their top pick-ups of the cycle. In the end, the race proved to be one of the closest in the state in 2010, with Duffey besting Robinson by only 377 votes.

He was sworn into his first term on January 3, 2011, and served as a member of the Finance and Appropriations Committee; the Financial Institutions, Housing, and Urban Development Committee; the Health and Aging Committee; and the Local Government Committee. He was also a member of the Joint Committee on Agency Rule Review.

Duffey won reelection to his seat in 2012 with 52.13% of the vote over Democrat Donna O'Connor.

House Initiatives and Positions
In his freshman term, Duffey's legislation to privatize oversight of the Department of Development, a major campaign plank of Governor John Kasich, has been slated for early action in the House. Duffey described the bill as a "framework" for a program that would be updated after six months with input from the DOD director. "Unlike a government agency, a private economic development corporation can move at the same speed as private industry, respond to changing markets and partner with the private sector," he said. "This, in turn, increases the likelihood of job creation in our state."

A supporter of S.B. 5 which limits collective bargaining for public employees, Duffey voted for its passage out of the Ohio House of Representatives. With a referendum pending that aims to overturn the passed measure, Duffey has said opponents will have a difficult time persuading voters to overturn a law that "is a restoration of power to the taxpayers and to the voters."

Duffey, while an opponent of the estate tax, has questioned the timing of its abolishment, citing the drastic cuts that are already taking place on the local level.  Over 80% of estate tax revenue goes to local government.

References

External links
The Ohio House of Representatives: Rep. Mike Duffey (R-Worthington) official site
 Mike Duffey for State Representative official campaign site

Ohio State University Moritz College of Law alumni
Living people
1977 births
People from Worthington, Ohio
University of Michigan College of Literature, Science, and the Arts alumni
Republican Party members of the Ohio House of Representatives
21st-century American politicians